Khaleem Hyland (born 5 June 1989) is a Trinidadian international footballer who plays for Al-Batin as a midfielder.

Club career

Early career 
Born in Carenage, Hyland began his career in 2007 with San Juan Jabloteh. In May 2007 it was announced that English side Portsmouth were close to agreeing a deal for the player. In August 2007, Hyland went on trial with Scottish side Celtic, but a £450,000 bid from the club was turned down. After he left San Juan Jabloteh in May 2008, Portsmouth were once again linked with signing Hyland. However, the club's initial application for a work permit was rejected by the Home Office. In September 2008 Portsmouth announced that they were still interested in signing Hyland. Hyland had to wait for a work permit to join Portsmouth, and it was announced that he would move to the club's Belgian feeder club, Zulte Waregem.

Zulte Waregem 
Hyland's loan move to Zulte Waregem was made official on Transfer deadline day, which is 2 February 2009, but his future at Zulte-Waregem became unsure when both clubs decided to stop their partnership in June 2009. A week later it was announced that Hyland was now signed on a permanent basis.

Genk 
He signed permanently for Genk on 9 August 2011, on a five-year-contract. On 9 May 2013, he assisted Bennard Kumordzi's goal to help his club win the 2013 Belgian Cup Final 2–0 against Cercle Brugge.

Westerlo 
On 12 June 2015, it was announced that Westerlo had signed the player on a one-year contract.

Saudi Arabia 
Hyland moved to the Middle East and signed with Saudi club Al Faisaly in June 2017. He scored his first goal on 14 October 2017.

In September 2020 he signed for Al-Batin.

International career
Hyland played for the national under-20's at the 2009 FIFA U-20 World Cup.

Hyland made his full international debut for Trinidad and Tobago on 26 January 2008 against Puerto Rico, and he scored his first international goal on 7 June 2008 against Jamaica in a friendly match at the Marvin Lee Stadium.

International goals 
Scores and results list Trinidad and Tobago's goal tally first.

Honours
Genk
Belgian Cup (1): 2012–13

References

1989 births
Living people
Trinidad and Tobago footballers
Trinidad and Tobago international footballers
Trinidad and Tobago expatriate footballers
San Juan Jabloteh F.C. players
Portsmouth F.C. players
S.V. Zulte Waregem players
K.R.C. Genk players
K.V.C. Westerlo players
TT Pro League players
Belgian Pro League players
Expatriate footballers in Belgium
Trinidad and Tobago expatriate sportspeople in Belgium
Expatriate footballers in England
Trinidad and Tobago expatriate sportspeople in England
Association football midfielders
2013 CONCACAF Gold Cup players
2014 Caribbean Cup players
2015 CONCACAF Gold Cup players
Expatriate footballers in Saudi Arabia
Saudi Professional League players
Al-Faisaly FC players
Al Batin FC players
2019 CONCACAF Gold Cup players
Trinidad and Tobago under-20 international footballers
Trinidad and Tobago youth international footballers